Ariège is a department in southwestern France, located in the region of Occitanie. It is named after the river Ariège and its capital is Foix. Ariège is known for its rural landscape, with a population of 153,287 as of 2019. Its INSEE and postal code is 09, hence the department's informal name of le zéro neuf. The inhabitants of the department are known as Ariègeois or Ariègeoises.

Geography 

The department is part of the current region of Occitanie. 
It borders Haute-Garonne to the west and north, Aude to the east, Pyrénées-Orientales to the south-east. To the south it borders Andorra and the Spanish Province of Lleida.
Covering an area of 4,890 km2, the department is divided into three arrondissements: Foix, Pamiers, and Saint-Girons.
It comprises 13 cantons, 21 intercommunalities, and 326 communes. In 2009 the Regional Natural Park of the Ariège Pyrenees was created covering about 40% of the area of the department of Ariège.

Natural regions
There are three main areas:

The Ariège plain
The north of the department consists of plains, hills and low valleys where agriculture is prevalent. Part of Lauragais covers the northeast of the department. Two major rivers, the Ariège and the Lèze traverse the plain from south to north. A landscape of grain fields dominates the scene with growing of sweetcorn and sunflowers and with prairies.

The Pyrenean foothills
This area includes the Plantaurel mountains and the Pre-Pyrenean hills below 1000 m. Various geological structures are present in contrast: the Foix Valley with its granite mountain landscape and the Lavelanet region with marl and limestone.

Ariège high country
The geography is dominated by the Pyrenees mountains exceeding 1,000 m above sea level which form the border between France and Spain. The Pica d'Estats (3143 m), the Pic de Montcalm (3077 m), and Pic de Sotllo (3072 m) are the highest points of the department. These peaks are clearly visible from Toulouse in the Haute Garonne.

The landscape is dominated by forests with coniferous species coexist with hardwoods such as chestnut trees, Black Locust trees, ash trees, and beech trees.

There are hundreds of kilometres of well-marked paths which allow exploration of the magnificent Pyrenees mountains. The high mountains are easily accessible via good roads, cable cars or by foot. There are a number of lodges providing high level mountain accommodation that are comfortable, warm and with good meals. There are also a number of fresh water lakes which provide a variety of activities including, walking, swimming, fishing, canoeing, sailboarding and picnicking.

There are several downhill ski resorts, the three largest being Ax-Bonascre, Les Monts D'Olmes and Guzet-Neige. There are many cross country ski-ing resorts, one of the best being at Plateau de Beille, near Les Cabannes. Ariège is one of the least populated and most unspoiled regions of France. The locals enjoy keeping traditions alive, especially old farming techniques. Consequently, as fewer insecticides, for example, have been used, the flora and fauna of the area continue to be rich in both diversity and numbers. Butterflies are common and birds are numerous; particularly noticeable are large birds of prey, including the magnificent Griffon vultures.

There are also many unspoiled villages and hamlets tucked away in the valleys close to the department's border with Spain – Seix, Cominac, and Aulus-les-Bains are examples – together with picturesque mountain villages, most notably Aleu which comes alive in the holiday season.

Climate
Ariège stands on the eastern limit of oceanic dominance over rainfall, but other influences are felt:

 Mediterranean – particularly visible in the vegetation of the foothills and of the valley of the Ariège river towards Tarascon, and in the Sault country
 Continental – in the Pyrenean valleys, with many storms and big differences of temperature between day and night

There is no great tendency to summer drought, as the flow of air from the north-west brings rain throughout the year. Rainfall is moderate on the foothills and in some sheltered valleys, measuring 700 to 1,000 mm per year, but increases significantly in the higher valleys with levels between 1,000 mm and 1,800 mm. The slopes exposed to the north-west, such as Aulus and Orlu, are, as one would expect, the wettest, together with the frontal ridges that meet air flow from the southwest (giving rise to the Foehn effect). Snow cover is common over 1,000 metres, lasting several months above 1,500 to 2,000 metres. Some periglacial areas exist over 2,500 m but the only true glacier in Ariège is that of Mont Valier, near Castillon-en-Couserans.

Temperatures are mild in the foothills, most notably at the city of Foix (400 metres) the average is 5 °C in January and 19 °C in July. However, they decline rapidly with elevation, e.g. at l'Hospitalet-près-l'Andorre (1,430 m) it is 0 °C in January and 14 °C in July.

History

Ariège is one of the original 83 departments created during the French Revolution on 4 March 1790 under the Act of 22 December 1789. It was created from the counties of Foix (Languedoc) and Couserans (Gascogne).

A request was made to the Council of State to rename the department Ariège-Pyrénées. According to the proponents of this project, the word "Pyrenees" would better position the department to promote itself throughout France. The demand was rejected.

Foix is the administrative capital of the Ariège. It is an ancient medieval town with a fortress, Chateau de Foix, perched on a hill overlooking it. The fortress has been attacked many times without being captured including an attempt by Simon de Montfort. It has also been used as a prison, and the names of English prisoners of war can still be seen on the cell walls. Another famous castle in the Ariège is Montségur, located on a rocky outcrop at a height of 1200 metres. During the Albigensian Crusade and siege in 1244 the castle was largely destroyed, with more than two hundred Cathar priests burnt at the stake as heretics. The castle was gradually rebuilt by Royalists over the next three hundred years.

The start of the seventeenth century saw the area ravaged by the Huguenot rebellions of Protestants against Catholics. In 1621 the Huguenot forces ruined the church at La Tour-du-Crieu. In 1629 Pamiers was sacked by Henry of Condé following uprisings that left several hundred dead in the city. This was also the period during which the abbeys at Foix, Tarascon-sur-Ariège, Saint-Girons, Saverdun and Le Mas-d'Azil were torched and destroyed.

The nineteenth century was a time of strong industrial growth, supported in Ariège by an abundant supply of water power. The department also benefited from its significant reserves of iron ore. The growth of iron-based industries was a feature of the period with the establishment, in 1817, of a steel manufacturing plant at Pamiers. This has been the principal driver of the local economy ever since. Other representative examples of the iron-based industries that developed in Ariège during the nineteenth century include the forges at Montgaillard and the blast furnaces at Tarascon-sur-Ariège.

An additional part of the department's industrial development during the nineteenth century was the paper industry at Saint-Girons and the textile industry in the Pays d'Olmes. Changes in forest laws in 1829 resulted in the War of the Maidens, a revolt by peasants who resisted losing their rights to use the forests. They disguised themselves as women while performing acts of rebellion.

Towns of particular historical interest in the department include Pamiers, which hosted a large commercial centre and three churches; Mirepoix, a medieval town; and Saint-Lizier, which is situated on a hilltop with winding streets, fine views, and a church with cloisters that are noteworthy. Saint-Girons is an agricultural centre with a Saturday market.

Heraldry

Anthem of Ariège 
The patriotic song Arièjo O moun Pais was written by Father Sabas Maury, born on 1 March 1863 in Gestiès in the valley of Siguer. He was the pastor of Miglos and Varilhes. It became the anthem for Ariège.

Economy 
The Ariège department is a largely unknown department which is situated next to Aude in the southwestern part of the Occitanie region. It shares its borders with Aude, Andorra, Haute-Garonne and Pyrénées-Orientales.

It is predominantly a farming area, as the soil is rich and fertile. More than 50% of Ariège is mountainous, with 490,965 hectares being covered by forests.

In the Ax valleys, the mining of talc is the most typical activity. The processing plant for talc at Luzenac is supplied by Carrière de talc de Trimouns, which is the largest producer in the region (400,000 tonnes per year).

This industry is supplemented by tourism. Winter sports resorts are located at Ax 3 Domaines, Ascou-Pailhères, Plateau de Beille, Le Chioula, and Goulier Neige.

In the Lavelanet area, the textile industry used to be significant, but much of the industry has moved out of the country and offshore. A few companies have tried to persist in the face of competition from lower cost-labor in Eastern Europe and Asia. New craftspeople installed themselves in the abandoned factories, like the brewery Le Grand Bison, now active for several years and counting gold and silver rewards for their beers.

In the Pamiers area metallurgy, aeronautics, and chemistry are the main industries. Metallurgy, at the Aubert & Duval factory, produces forgings for the aerospace and energy industries. Several companies are in the aeronautics outsourcing industry, such as Recaero and Maz'Air, partners with aircraft manufacturers. Chemistry is represented by the paint industry with the Alliance Maestria, which includes several companies making paint for anything from buildings to aircraft. In the same sector, Etienne Lacroix in the commune of Mazères, mainly manufactures fireworks and pyrotechnics.

For the Saint-Girons area, industry is in decline. It is represented mainly by the production of paper.

Hydroelectric production from Ariège is about one-fifth of Pyrenean production. The hydroelectric plant at Aston has the largest annual production capacity in the Pyrenees (392 million kWh). With Orlu and L'Hospitalet-près-l'Andorre, these three plants have the largest capacity in the department. The hydroelectric developments in Ariège can support a city of 600,000 inhabitants. Large industrial plants use the energy produced together with the natural gas from Lacq.

The Ariège Chamber of Commerce and Industry is situated at Foix. The department's Economic Development Agency ("Ariège Expansion") is at Verniolle. The department has established three 'business incubators' to support enterprise in Ariège.

Transportation

Mostly mountainous and rural, the department of Ariège is far from the main transport routes serving the main valleys and coastlines. The railway arrived in the department in 1861 with the Toulouse to Puigcerda line which is the only line that remains open to this day in the department. Besides the trains of the TER Occitanie, this route is still served by Intercity trains from Paris-Austerlitz.

Since 2002 Ariège has been connected to the national motorway network via the A66 autoroute which joins the A61 autoroute at Villefranche-de-Lauragais and continues south of Pamiers by the National Route NR20 as a dual carriageway as far as Tarascon-sur-Ariège.

Demographics 

The department has 153,287 inhabitants (2019). The populations of the arrondissements are (2019):
 Arrondissement of Foix – 47,433
 Arrondissement of Pamiers – 64,972
 Arrondissement of Saint-Girons – 40,882

Principal towns

The most populous commune is Pamiers; the prefecture Foix is the second-most populous. As of 2019, there are 10 communes with more than 3,000 inhabitants:

The main urban areas are those of Pamiers, Foix and Saint-Girons.

Housing 
According to INSEE  24.6% of available housing in Ariège consisted of secondary residences. The following table indicates the main communes in Ariège (population more than 1,000) where second homes or occasional residences comprise more than 10% of total housing.

Communes with more than 10% Secondary Residences (2017)

Politics 
The department has two parliamentary constituencies and 13 cantons. In general it can be said that:
"With a republican and secular tradition since the Third Republic, Ariège is firmly held by the Socialist Party (PS) even though in recent years the right has managed to sink a few corners of the fortress".

This resulted in a parliamentary representation until 2017 was dominated by the PS and a General Council where 19 of the 22 members were PS or close to this party – the political orientation of the department is therefore clearly identified. In 2007 it was the department with the most votes for Ségolène Royal (59.56%). In 2012 it had the third most voters for François Hollande in France with 64.69% after Corrèze and Seine Saint-Denis.

Although male/female parity is well respected by MPs (Mrs. Frédérique Massat and Mr. Alain Fauré), all 22 councillors were men until 2011 when two women were elected.

The President of the Departmental Council is Christine Tequi of the Socialist Party.

Culture 
The region was originally part of Aquitaine and has retained many hallmarks of the Gascon culture and Gascon language.

Gastronomy 
The gastronomy of Ariège is based on the cooking of Pyrenean regional food, such as cheese or charcuterie from the mountain country. Azinat is the local and typical dish of Ariège. The department is also well advanced in the field of organic farming.

Films 
 1975: Le Passe-Montagne (The Mountain Pass), author Christian Bernadac, director Jean Vernier (television film)
 1980: L'Orsalhèr by Jean Fléchet
 1982: Le Retour de Martin Guerre, by Daniel Vigne
 2009: No pasarán, film by Éric Martin and Emmanuel Caussé filmed in the Vicdessos Valley (Miglos Lapège) near Saint-Girons in the Couserans at Foix and at Tarascon-sur-Ariège

Literature 
 Several novels by Louis Henry Destel are set in Ariège.
 The detective story by Pascal Dessaint Les Pis rennais (The Octopus) is set in the Couserans. It has been reprinted in comics.
 Most of the novels by George-Patrick Gleize published by the Parisian publisher Albin Michel feature Ariège or the Pyrenees such as  Le Temps en héritage (Foix country), Un brin d'espérance (A strand of hope) (Olmes country), Rue des Hortensias Rouge (Ax-les-Thermes country), Le Forgeron de la liberté (Mirepoix country), Le Sentier des pastelliers (Mazéres region), La Vie en plus (Couserans), Le Destin de Marthe Rivière (Le Quérigut), Le Chemin de Peyreblanque or L'Auberge des myrtilles (Tarascon country), Une nuit en juin (Cerdagne and Pamiers region).

Music 
 Mirepoix Musique promotes concerts of classical music, talks and readings in and around Mirepoix.
 Making Music at Malegoude
 Vocal Festival of La Bellongaise at Orgibet
 Jazz at Foix
 Garosnow at Ax-les-Thermes
 Art Show, contemporary music room (Holy Cross volvestre)

Theatre 
 MiMa  is an international festival of the art of marionettes held every summer in Mirepoix. Each year the event is guided by a central theme. The line-up showcases a variety of techniques including object theatre, glove puppets, string puppets and marionettes portées (puppets carried by a handle on the back of the head).

Tourism

Notable people linked to the department

Art 
 Joseph Bergès (1878–1956), born in Saint-Girons, was a painter.
 René Gaston-Lagorre (1913–2004) was a painter who had his workshop in Couserans and lived in Seix.
 Pierre Daboval (1918–2015) was an artist. He lived in Mirepoix from 1998 until his death.
 Mady de La Giraudière (1922–) is a painter born in Lavelanet.
 Roger Bataille (1926–62), born in Foix, was a painter.
 Christian d'Orgeix (1927–), the surrealist painter, was born in Foix.

Film 
 Terence Macartney-Filgate (1924–) is a British-Canadian film director living in Mirepoix. He has directed, written, produced or shot more than 100 films in a career spanning more than 50 years.
Richard Stanley (1966–), the South African film director, lives in Montségur

Literature 
 Marie de Calages (1630–1661), born in Mirepoix, was a poet, crowned many times by l'Académie des Jeux Floraux.
 Pierre Bayle (1647–1706), philosopher and writer born at Carla-Bayle (then called Carla-le-Comte; the commune was renamed in his honour)
 Frédéric Soulié (1800–1847), novelist born in Foix, lived as a boy in Mirepoix
 Napoléon Peyrat, born in 1809 at Les Bordes-sur-Arize, died in 1881, pastor, historian of the Cathars and a poet
 Marie-Louise (born 1876 in Mirepoix) and Raymond Escholier (born 1882 in Paris), co-authors of "regionalist" novels such as Cantegril which won the Prix Fémina in 1922
 Isabelle Sandy (1884–1975), writer born in Saint-Pierre-de-Rivière
 Louis-Henry Destel (1885–1962), novelist born in Lézat-sur-Lèze, died at Saint-Girons.
 Marcel Pagnol (1895–1974), the novelist, playwright and filmmaker, taught at the École Supérieure in Mirepoix.
 Raymond Abellio (Georges Soulès) (1907–1986) philosopher, novelist. His paternal family came from Ax-les-Thermes and his maternal family was from Seix in Haut-Couserans
 Gaston Massat (1909–1966), surrealist poet and resistance fighter born in Saint-Girons
 Michel-Aimé Baudouy (1909–1999), scholar, novelist, and playwright born in Vernet d'Ariège
 Max Leclerc (1923–), writer and television director, lived in the commune of Durfort (Maloureille) from 1974 to 1988
 Christian Bernadac (1937–2003), journalist and writer born in Tarascon-sur-Ariège
 Georges-Patrick Gleize (1952–), novelist and historian
 Patrick Cintas (1954–), writer, painter, sculptor, and composer
 Remy Marrot (author of the novel 'Le Tribunal du peuple') teaches in Pamiers.

Music 
 Aycart del Fossat (fl.1250–68) was a troubadour from Le Fossat
 Gabriel Fauré (1845–1924), composer, born in Pamiers
 Marie Laforêt (1939–2019) singer and actress. She defined herself as "Ariégeoise". Granddaughter of Louis Doumenach, founder of Lavelanet, a textile company
 Christian Ton Ton Salut (1953–) is a jazz musician. He lived in Pamiers from 1958 to 1977 and began his musical career with Marc Feinder's orchestra in 1970
 Daniel Lassalle (1965–), born in Lavelanet, is a baroque trombonist and sackbut player

Politics 
 Marc Guillaume Alexis Vadier (1736–1828), politician, member of the National Convention, creator of the department of Ariège
 Joseph Lakanal (1762–1845), born in Serres-sur-Arget, member of the National Convention
 Alfred de Jancigny (1824–1892), préfect of Ariège in 1864
 Léon Galy-Gasparrou (1850–1921), MP for Ariège
 Alpinien Pabot-Chatelard, préfect of Ariège from 1892 to 1898
 Théophile Delcassé (1852–1923), politician, several times Minister of Foreign Affairs, in particular during the conclusion of the Entente cordiale with Great Britain, born in Pamiers
 Paul Caujolle (1891–1955), Mayor of Siguer, General Counsel of Ariège and President of the National Assocuiation of Accountants
 Pierre Dumas (1891–1967), born and died at Saint-Martin-d'Oydes (where an avenue is named after him), writer and journalist, great resistance fighter known as "Saint Jean", politician, MP for Haute-Garonne
 François Camel (1893–1941)
 Georges Galy-Gasparrou (1896–1977), MP, Secretary of State for Information, Mayor of Massat
 Roger Fauroux (1926–), former Minister, former Mayor of Saint-Girons
 Augustin Bonrepaux (1936–), politician, former MP for Ariège and President of the General Council of Ariège, former president of the Finance Commission for the National Assembly. Participated in the opening of the road to Ariège particularly the Puymorens Tunnel
 Jean-Pierre Bel (1951–), senator, President of the Senate of France since 1 October 2011
 André Trigano (1925–) Officer of the Legion of Honour. He was Mayor of Mazères for 24 years, General Councillor for the Canton of Saverdun and MP for the 2nd electoral district of Ariège from 1993 to 1997. Mayor of Pamiers, he is also the brother of Gilbert Trigano, the co-founder of Club Med
 Paul Vaillant-Couturier (Paris 1892–1937) originally from Sainte-Croix-Volvestre
 Frédérique Massat (1964–), MP for Ariège since 2007

Religion 
 Jacques Fournier (1285–1342), Bishop of Pamiers then of Mirepoix, Pope under the name of Benedict XII from 1336 to 1342 (Avignon), born in Canté near Saverdun
 François de Caulet (1610–1680), Bishop of Pamiers
 Jean-François Boyer (1675–1755), Bishop of Mirepoix from 1730 to 1736, tutor to the Dauphin, Louis XV's son.
 Sabas Maury, Pastor of Miglos from 1890 to 1906 and creator of Arièjo ô moun Païs the well-known Ariége hymn
 Philippe Mousset, Bishop of Pamiers, Couserans, Mirepoix. Appointed on 8 January 2009 by Pope Benedict XVI

Science 
 Raymond Augustin Mailhat ((1862–1923)) born in Saurat, was a manufacturer of telescopes and precision optical instruments.

Sport 
 Louis-Henry Destel (1885–1962), rugby writer, born in Lézat-sur-Lèze
 Jacques Dupont (1928–2019), cyclist, Olympic record holder, born in Lézat-sur-Lèze
 Claude Piquemal (1939–), athlete, French sprinter, Olympic medallist, born in Siguer
 Aldo Quaglio (1932–), French international rugby player, born and trained in Lavelanet
 Jacques Crampagne (1944–), French international rugby player, born in Foix
 Patrick Estève (1959–), French international rugby player, born and trained in Lavelanet
 Jocelyn Degeihl (1959–), CN3 judo, vice champion of France, 1st Black Belt in the city of Foix
 Sylvain Dispagne (1968–), French international rugby player, born in Saint-Girons
 Jean-Louis Jordana (1968–), French international rugby player, born and trained in Lavelanet
 Laurent Bonzon (1969–), vice champion of Europe for Judo Jujitsu
 Michel Marfaing (1970–), French international rugby player, born and trained in Pamiers
 Fabien Barthez (1971–), French international football player, born in Lavelanet
 Eric Carrière (1973–), French international footballer, born in Foix
 Fabien Pelous (1973–), French international rugby player, born in Toulouse and trained in Saverdun
 Benoît Baby (1983–), French international rugby player, born in Lavelanet and trained in Toulouse
 Mylène Guirault (1985–), vice world champion for jujitsu
 Yoann Huget (1987–), French international rugby player, born in Pamiers and trained in Toulouse
 Jean-Marc Doussain (1991–), French international rugby player, born and trained in Toulouse, originally from Sainte-Croix-Volvestre

See also 
 Cantons of the Ariège department
 Communes of the Ariège department
 Arrondissements of the Ariège department

References

External links 

  Departmental Council website
  Prefecture website
  Ariège tourism website
  Trekking in Ariège Pyrenees website 
  Ariège Photography Panoramics 360° website
  Pyrenees Photography Panoramics 360° website 2
  Department of Arriège: Accounts for Communes and Groupings: – Individual data Budget principle only – Consolidated data "Principle Budget and annexes" 
 Ariège Chamber of Commerce and Industry
 Ariége economic portal 

 
1790 establishments in France
Departments of Occitania (administrative region)
States and territories established in 1790